Hogin is a surname. Notable people with the surname include:
James Latimer Hogin (1801–1876), American politician from Iowa, father of John Chrisfield
John Chrisfield Hogin (1823–1886), American politician from Iowa, son of James Latimer
Laurie Hogin (born 1963), American artist
Sam Hogin (1950–2004), American country songwriter

See also
Hogan (surname)